Lodi may refer to:

Places

Canada
 Lodi, Ontario, a community in North Stormont, Ontario, Canada

Italy
 Lodi, Lombardy, in the Province of Lodi of the Lombardy region
 Treaty of Lodi, 1454 between Italian city-states
 Battle of Lodi, 1796 in Lodi
 Province of Lodi, a province in the Lombardy region of Italy
 Lodi Vecchio, a commune of the Lombardy region

United States
 Lodi, Arkansas
 Lodi, California
 Lodi AVA, a California wine region
 Lodi Academy, a school in Lodi, California
 Lodi, Illinois (disambiguation), various places
 Lodi, Indiana
 Lodi, Michigan (disambiguation), various places
 Lodi, Mississippi (disambiguation), various places
 Lodi, Missouri
 Lodi, Nebraska
 Lodi, Nevada
 Lodi, New Jersey
 Lodi (village), New York, a village in Seneca County
 Lodi, New York, a town in Seneca County
 Lodi, Ohio
 Lodi, Texas
 Lodi, Virginia
 Lodi, Wisconsin, a city
 Lodi (town), Wisconsin
 Lodi Township, Athens County, Ohio
 Lodi Township, Michigan
 Lodi Township, Minnesota
 Lodi Township, New Jersey, a township that existed in Bergen County, New Jersey, United States, from 1826 to 1935

Music
 "Lodi" (Creedence Clearwater Revival song), a track from the 1969 album Green River 
 "Lodi", a song from the Bollywood film Veer-Zaara, directed by Yash Chopra

Tribes
 Lodi (Pashtun tribe), a Pashtun tribe mainly found in Afghanistan and Pakistan
 Lodi dynasty of Multan
 Lodi dynasty, a Pashtun Lodi dynasty ruling North India from 1451 to 1526

Other uses
 Lodi (apple), a variety of apple
 Lodi (ship), a type of Estonian barge or sailing ship; See Emajõgi
 Lodi (wrestler) (born 1970), in-ring name of professional wrestler Brad Cain
 Lodi station (disambiguation), stations of the name
 Lodi Gardens, a park in New Delhi, India
 Lodi Road, a street in New Delhi, India
 Francesco Lodi (born 1984), Italian association football player
 Renan Lodi (born 1998), Brazilian association football player
 Lohri or Lodi, an annual festival in Northern India
 Lodi, part of the soul that lives in the forest, rather than in a son or totem, in Mbuti mythology

See also
 Lodhi (disambiguation) 
 Lodi High School (disambiguation)